Les McCann Ltd. Plays the Shampoo (subtitled At the Village Gate) is a live album by pianist Les McCann recorded in 1961 and released on the Pacific Jazz label. The album was recorded at the same residency as Les McCann Ltd. in New York but not released until 1963.

Reception

Allmusic rated the album 3 stars.

Track listing 
All compositions by Les McCann except as indicated
 "The Shampoo" - 4:08
 "Too Close for Comfort" (Jerry Bock, George David Weiss, Larry Holofcener) - 4:53
 "You I Thought I Knew" - 7:00
 "Woody 'n You" (Dizzy Gillespie) - 3:08
 "Someone Stole My Chitlins" - 3:58
 "Out of This World"  (Harold Arlen, Johnny Mercer) - 5:28
 "Filet of Soul"  - 3:26
 "Smile Stacey" - 5:10

Personnel 
Les McCann - piano
Herbie Lewis - bass
Ron Jefferson - drums

References 

Les McCann live albums
1963 live albums
Pacific Jazz Records live albums
Albums recorded at the Village Gate